The Federation of Asian Bishops' Conferences (FABC) is an association of episcopal conferences of Catholic Church in South, Southeast, East and Central Asia. The federation fosters solidarity and joint responsibility for the welfare of the Church and of society in the region.

The conference includes sixteen (or nineteen) Bishops' Conferences from Bangladesh, East Timor, India (both the CBCI and the individual conferences of the Syro-Malabar, Syro-Malankara and Roman Rites), Indonesia, Japan, Korea, Laos-Cambodia, Malaysia-Singapore-Brunei, Myanmar, Pakistan, Philippines, Sri Lanka, Taiwan (RoC), Thailand and Vietnam and collective Bishops' Conference of Central Asia.
Associate members are from Hong Kong, Macau, Mongolia, Nepal, Novosibirsk (Russia).

Founded in 1970, the FABC was due to mark its 50th anniversary in 2020, but the celebration was postponed due to the COVID-19 pandemic. Instead, the 50th anniversary of the FABC was celebrated at Baan Phu Wan Pastoral Center, Archdiocese of Bangkok, Thailand, on October 12, 2022.

Member Bishops' Conferences

Full members 
 Catholic Bishops' Conference of Bangladesh
 Catholic Bishops' Conference of India
 Conference of Catholic Bishops of India – Latin Rite
 Syro-Malabar Bishops' Synod
 Holy Episcopal Synod of the Syro-Malankara Catholic Church
 Bishops' Conference of Indonesia
 Catholic Bishops' Conference of Japan
 Bishops' Conference of Central Asia
 Catholic Bishops' Conference of Korea
 Catholic Bishops' Conference of Laos-Cambodia
 Catholic Bishops' Conference of Malaysia, Singapore and Brunei
 Catholic Bishops' Conference of Myanmar
 Catholic Bishops' Conference of Pakistan
 Catholic Bishops' Conference of the Philippines
 Catholic Bishops' Conference of Sri Lanka
 Chinese Regional Bishops' Conference (Taiwan)
 Catholic Bishops' Conference of Thailand
 Episcopal Conference of Timor-Leste
 Catholic Bishops' Conference of Vietnam
Episcopal Conference of China
Episcopal Conference of Nepal
Episcopal Conference of Mongolia

Associate members 
 Diocese of Hong Kong
 Diocese of Macau
 Apostolic Prefecture of Ulaanbaatar (Mongolia)
 Apostolic Vicariate of Nepal

Former members 
 Bishops' Conference of Kazakhstan (until 2022)

Presidents
Cardinal Stephen Kim Sou-hwan, Archbishop of Seoul, South Korea (1973 – 1977) 
Mariano Gaviola y Garcés, Archbishop of Lipa, Philippines (1977–1984) 
 Henry Sebastian D'Souza, Archbishop of Calcutta, India (1984–1993) 
Oscar Cruz, Archbishop of Lingayen-Dagupan, Philippines (1993–2000) 
 Oswald Gomis, Archbishop of Colombo, Sri Lanka (2000–2005) 
Cardinal Orlando Quevedo, Archbishop of Cotabato, Philippines (2005 – 2011) 
Cardinal Oswald Gracias, Archbishop of Bombay, India (2011 – 2018)
Cardinal Charles Maung Bo, Archbishop of Yangon, Myanmar (2019 - present)

Asian Youth Day
Asian Youth Day was started in 1999 under the auspices of the federation.
AYD 1 - 1999, Hua Hin, Thailand, “Asian Youth Journeying with Jesus Towards the Third Millenium”
AYD 2 - 2001, Taipei, Taiwan, “We are Called to Sanctity and Solidarity”
AYD 3 - 2003, Bangalore, India, “Asian Youth for Peace”
AYD 4 - 2006, Hong Kong, “Youth, Hope of Asian Families”
AYD 5 - 2009, Imus, Philippines, “YAsia Fiesta! Young Asians: Come Together, Share the Word, Live the Eucharist”
AYD 6 - 2014, Daejeon, Korea, “Asian Youth, Wake Up! The Glory of the Martyrs Shines on You”
AYD 7 - 2017, Yogyakarta, Indonesia, “Joyful Asian Youth! Living the Gospel in Multicultural Asia”

See also 
 Catholic Church in Asia
List of Catholic dioceses of Asia

References

Further reading
 
 
 
 
 

Ecumenical councils
Asia